is a Japanese social network game created by Konami that was released on the GREE social networking platform in 2010. A manga adaptation titled Dragon Collection: Ryū o Suberu Mono was serialized from 2011 to 2012 in Kodansha's shōnen manga magazine Weekly Shōnen Magazine. It was collected in six tankōbon volumes. A trading card arcade game was released in 2013. An anime television series adaptation aired on April 7, 2014 alongside Monster Retsuden Oreca Battle, another Konami video game adaptation. The series ended on March 23, 2015, but a bonus episode showing events after Hiro leaves Dragon Earth aired March 30, 2015.
This show, along with Oreca Battle, lacks an ending theme, a hallmark of anime that premiered on TV Asahi.

Synopsis
A young boy named Hiro wishes to play the eponymous video game with his father. Arriving early to the arcade, he begins a game, finds himself whisked away to the Dragon Collection universe. Trapped within the game's plot, Hiro must become a Dragon Master to escape the game and return home. Hiro embarks on a quest to gather allies, conquer monsters, and prevent a terrible evil from being freed on Dragon Earth.

Opening theme
 "Dragon Collection ~Yūki no Tsubasa~" by Nagareda Project

Episode list

References

External links
  
 Official anime website 

2010 video games
2013 video games
Japanese children's animated television series
Android (operating system) games
Arcade video games
Arcade-only video games
Digital collectible card games
IOS games
Japan-exclusive video games
Kodansha manga
Konami franchises
Konami games
Mobile games
OLM, Inc.
Card games in anime and manga
Shōnen manga
Gacha games
Video games developed in Japan